Strongman is a 2009 documentary about strongman Stanley Pleskun, and his relationships with his girlfriend and his family.

References

2009 films
Biographical documentary films